The 2003 Extremaduran regional election was held on Sunday, 25 May 2003, to elect the 6th Assembly of the autonomous community of Extremadura. All 65 seats in the Assembly were up for election. The election was held simultaneously with regional elections in twelve other autonomous communities and local elections all throughout Spain.

The Spanish Socialist Workers' Party (PSOE), which in this election ran in coalition with the Extremaduran Coalition, enlarged its absolute majority from 34 to 36 seats, at the cost of the opposition People's Party (PP), which fell to 26 and lost ground for the first time since the 1987 election. United Left (IU), which formed a coalition with the Independent Socialists of Extremadura (SIEx), maintained its 3 seats but was unable to make gains.

Juan Carlos Rodríguez Ibarra was elected for his sixth and last term in office as President of the Regional Government of Extremadura, as he would announce in September 2006 he would not stand for re-election in 2007.

Overview

Electoral system
The Assembly of Extremadura was the devolved, unicameral legislature of the autonomous community of Extremadura, having legislative power in regional matters as defined by the Spanish Constitution and the Extremaduran Statute of Autonomy, as well as the ability to vote confidence in or withdraw it from a regional president.

Voting for the Assembly was on the basis of universal suffrage, which comprised all nationals over 18 years of age, registered in Extremadura and in full enjoyment of their political rights. The 65 members of the Assembly of Extremadura were elected using the D'Hondt method and a closed list proportional representation, with an electoral threshold of five percent of valid votes—which included blank ballots—being applied in each constituency. Alternatively, parties failing to reach the threshold in one of the constituencies were also entitled to enter the seat distribution as long as they ran candidates in both districts and reached five percent regionally. Seats were allocated to constituencies, corresponding to the provinces of Badajoz and Cáceres, with each being allocated an initial minimum of 20 seats and the remaining 25 being distributed in proportion to their populations.

The electoral law provided that parties, federations, coalitions and groupings of electors were allowed to present lists of candidates. However, groupings of electors were required to secure the signature of at least 2 percent of the electors registered in the constituency for which they sought election. Electors were barred from signing for more than one list of candidates. Concurrently, parties and federations intending to enter in coalition to take part jointly at an election were required to inform the relevant Electoral Commission within ten days of the election being called.

Election date
The term of the Assembly of Extremadura expired four years after the date of its previous election. Elections to the Assembly were fixed for the fourth Sunday of May every four years. The previous election was held on 13 June 1999, setting the election date for the Assembly on Sunday, 25 May 2003.

The president had the prerogative to dissolve the Assembly of Extremadura and call a snap election, provided that no motion of no confidence was in process, no nationwide election was due and some time requirements were met: namely, that dissolution did not occur either during the first legislative session or within the legislature's last year ahead of its scheduled expiry, nor before one year had elapsed since a previous dissolution under this procedure. In the event of an investiture process failing to elect a regional president within a two-month period from the first ballot, the Assembly was to be automatically dissolved and a fresh election called. Any snap election held as a result of these circumstances would not alter the period to the next ordinary election, with elected deputies merely serving out what remained of their four-year terms.

Opinion polls
The table below lists voting intention estimates in reverse chronological order, showing the most recent first and using the dates when the survey fieldwork was done, as opposed to the date of publication. Where the fieldwork dates are unknown, the date of publication is given instead. The highest percentage figure in each polling survey is displayed with its background shaded in the leading party's colour. If a tie ensues, this is applied to the figures with the highest percentages. The "Lead" column on the right shows the percentage-point difference between the parties with the highest percentages in a poll. When available, seat projections determined by the polling organisations are displayed below (or in place of) the percentages in a smaller font; 33 seats were required for an absolute majority in the Assembly of Extremadura.

Results

Overall

Distribution by constituency

Aftermath

Notes

References
Opinion poll sources

Other

2003 in Extremadura
Extremadura
Regional elections in Extremadura
May 2003 events in Europe